Alexander Stuart Kennedy (24 January 1891 – 15 November 1959) was a Hampshire cricketer and one of the ten highest wicket-takers in first-class cricket.

Cricket career
Kennedy was a right-arm medium-pace bowler who first played for Hampshire when he was only 16. He played only irregularly up to 1910, but in 1912 became the third highest wicket-taker in county cricket, with 112 wickets at an average of 17. After injury in 1913, Kennedy took 164 wickets, average 20, in 1914. In 1919 he took seven for 47 against Surrey at the Oval – one of only three games Surrey lost at The Oval between the end of World War I and 1927.

Although he began as a tail-end batsman, Kennedy developed his defence so well that by 1921 he often opened the batting. When he scored 101 against Kent in 1923, Wisden said "he was caution itself up to a point, but hit twelve fours". His batting however was inconsistent and declined during his later career.

With the development of his batting, Kennedy was between 1921 and 1932 one of the most effective all-rounders in the game. Kennedy toured South Africa in 1922–23, where he did well on the matting pitches, taking 31 wickets in his only Test series. He returned to South Africa in 1924–25 with S. B. Joel's XI, taking 21 wickets in the five-match series of matches against South Africa.

Kennedy took his best figures of 10 for 37 for Players against Gentlemen in 1927. He took over 100 wickets every season apart from 1926 until 1932, after which he was selected as one of Wisden's Cricketers of the Year. The dry summers of 1933 and 1934 saw Kennedy's bowling decline, but he still played a vital role as Hampshire's stock bowler. He retired to coach at Cheltenham College at the end of 1934, but returned to the Hampshire team during the school holidays and bowled effectively – aided by the new leg before wicket law – taking seven for 46 against Northamptonshire, and six for 94 against Essex. After a few matches in 1936 Kennedy's first-class career ended for good.

He coached cricket in South Africa from 1947 to 1954.

See also
 List of Test cricketers born in non-Test playing nations

References

External links
 

1891 births
1959 deaths
England Test cricketers
Scottish cricketers
Hampshire cricketers
Wisden Cricketers of the Year
Marylebone Cricket Club cricketers
Players cricketers
North v South cricketers
East of England cricketers
Cricketers from Edinburgh
Cricketers who have taken ten wickets in an innings
S. B. Joel's XI cricketers
English cricketers of 1919 to 1945
H. D. G. Leveson Gower's XI cricketers
C. I. Thornton's XI cricketers
L. G. Robinson's XI cricketers
L. H. Tennyson's XI cricket team
English cricket coaches
Marylebone Cricket Club South African Touring Team cricketers